The 11-day weekend was the name given by the British media to the period of time between Friday, 22 April and 2 May 2011.

As a moveable feast, the bank holidays for Easter (Good Friday and Easter Monday) can occur any day between 20 March and 26 April. Since the early May Day bank holiday was introduced in 1978 it has occasionally fallen on the Monday immediately after Easter Monday. As this was due to happen in 2011, many forward-thinking workers were able to book four days of holiday that in reality meant 11 days off work.

On 23 November 2010, Buckingham Palace announced that the date of the Wedding of Prince William of Wales and Kate Middleton was to be 29 April; and that it would be a Bank Holiday, thus reducing the need for holiday entitlement to three days.

There had been an 11-day weekend in the United Kingdom before: in Scotland between 25 December 1999 and 4 January 2000, a period which contained five  bank holidays. This event happened at a time of year when it is now accepted that many days' productivity will be lost, whereas the 2011 “weekend” was during the Spring and at a time of global recession. These economic “lost 11 days” echo an actual loss of 11 days that happened in 1752.

Notes

Public holidays in the United Kingdom
British culture
2011 in the United Kingdom
May 2011 events in the United Kingdom